The Indian mackerel (Rastrelliger kanagurta) is a species of mackerel in the scombrid family (family Scombridae) of order Perciformes. It is commonly found in the Indian and West
Pacific oceans, and their surrounding seas. It is an important food fish and is commonly used in South and South-East Asian cuisine.

It is known by various names, such as Pelaling in Malaysia and Indonesia,Bangdo (बांगडो) in Konkani language, Bangdi  (બાંગડી) in Gujarati, Bangda (बांगडा) in Marathi, Kajol Gouri (কাজল গৌরী) in Bengali, Ayla (അയല, ഐല) in Malayalam, Kankarta (କାନକରତା) in Odia,  Kaanankeluthi (காணாங்கெலுத்தி) in Tamil and Bangude (ಬಂಗುಡೆ) in Tulu,  and Kannada.

Distribution and habitat

The Indian mackerel is found in warm shallow waters along the  coasts of the Indian and Western Pacific oceans. Its range extends from the Red Sea and East Africa in the west to Indonesia in the east, and from China and the Ryukyu Islands in the north to Australia, Melanesia and Samoa in the south. It has been reported on two occasions (1967, 2010) in the Mediterranean Sea off Israel, a likely entry via the Suez Canal.

Description
The body of the Indian mackerel is moderately deep, and the head is longer than the body depth. The maxilla are partly concealed, covered by the lacrimal bone, but extend till around the hind margin of the eye.

These fish have thin dark longitudinal bands on the upper part of the body, which may be golden on fresh specimens. There is also a black spot on the body near the lower margin of the pectoral fin. Dorsal fins are yellowish with black tips, while the caudal and pectoral fins are yellowish. The remaining fins are dusky.

Habitat and diet
The Indian mackerel is generally found in shallow, coastal waters, where the surface water temperature is at least . Adults of this species are found in coastal bays, harbours and deep lagoons. They are commonly found in turbid waters rich in plankton.

Adult Indian mackerel feed on macroplankton including the larvae of shrimp and fish.

Life history
The spawning season around India, which is in the northern hemisphere, is between March and September. Around Seychelles in the southern hemisphere, it is between September and the following March.

Spawning occurs in batches. The eggs are laid in the water and are externally fertilized. The Indian mackerel do not guard their eggs, which are left to develop on their own.

Juveniles feed on phytoplankton like diatoms and small zooplankton including cladocerans and ostracods. As they mature, their intestines shorten, and their diet changes to primarily include macroplankton such as the larvae of shrimp and fish.

References

External links

 

Fish of Thailand
Scombridae
Commercial fish
Fish described in 1816
Taxa named by Georges Cuvier
Rastrelliger